The O'Reilly Factor for Kids: A Survival Guide for America's Youth is a book written by Fox News Channel commentator Bill O'Reilly.  It was published in 2004 and covers issues that kids face in their teenage years, such as drugs, sexual intercourse, money, smoking, alcohol and friends.

Reception 
The New York Times said the book "is best understood not as a useful guide for adolescents" but "as an extension of the Bill O'Reilly brand". Writing in The Village Voice, Alan Scherstuhl called the book "crap", noting that it contained the "barking, pugilistic style of his TV and radio shows". Rebecca Onion, in PopMatters, said the book's advice "is innocuous, bordering on helpful" but that O'Reilly mistakenly believes that "everything that works for him will work for others" and that the book features "cringeworthy" sections that engage in "kid talk."

References

External links
Book information at billoreilly.com

Self-help books
Books by Bill O'Reilly (political commentator)
HarperCollins books
2004 non-fiction books